Simon de Langres was a French Dominican friar from Burgundy and Master General of the Dominican Order from 1352 to 1366.

From 1350 to 1352 was he was the Provincial of France. In 1360 he was made the Nuncio (Papal envoy) to France, and in 1363 to Hungary. On 16 March 1366, Simon was appointed Bishop of Nantes and resigned his position of Master of the Dominican Order. In 1382 he was transferred to the diocese of Vannes, but one year later resigned. On 7 June 1384 he died in the convent of Nantes.

During his tenure were established the Studia Generalia solicited by Emperor Charles IV and was celebrated the famous Chapter of Prague, in 1359, during which the emperor filled the friars of the most delicate attentions.

Sources
 Daniel Antonin Mortier, Histoire des maîtres généraux de l'Ordre des frères prêcheurs, Picara 1907, Vol. 3

1384 deaths
French Dominicans
Bishops of Nantes
Year of birth unknown
Masters of the Order of Preachers
14th-century French Roman Catholic bishops